Macrothyatira flavimargo is a moth in the family Drepanidae. It is found in western China (Gansu, Sichuan, Yunnan).

The forewings are fuscous brown, traversed by several darker and paler wavy lines. There is a purplish-brown spot at the base of the wing, this colour also extends over the thorax. The reniform stigma is outlined with blackish and there is a round pinkish-white spot above it, and a larger curved spot towards the apex, outwardly edged with black. On the middle of the inner margin is a narrow erect whitish spot, and towards the anal angle a round ochreous one edged with whitish. The fringe is brown beyond a sinuous black terminal line. The hindwings are fuliginous.

References

Moths described in 1900
Thyatirinae
Moths of Asia